Třebešice is a municipality and village in Kutná Hora District in the Central Bohemian Region of the Czech Republic. It has about 300 inhabitants.

Sights
Třebešice is known for the Třebešice Castle.

References

Villages in Kutná Hora District